"Ai Se Eu Te Pego" (English: "Oh, If I Catch You") is a 2008 Brazilian song by Sharon Acioly and Antônio Dyggs, with co-authorship by Aline da Fonseca, Amanda Teixeira and Karine Assis Vinagre and first performed by Os Meninos de Seu Zeh, directed by Dyggs himself.

It was recorded by Brazilian band Cangaia de Jegue and then covered by many other regional Brazilian bands like Garota Safada, Arreio de Ouro, Estakazero, Forró Sacode, and Saia Rodada. In 2011, it was popularized by Brazilian singer Michel Teló, becoming an international hit. Teló also released an English-language version, "If I Catch You".

Lyrics
The lyrics begin with two cries of "Nossa! Nossa!" short for "nossa senhora" - Our Lady, the Virgin Mary, an equivalent of "Wow!" in Brazilian Portuguese. Then Assim você me mata, "You kill me," a common exclamation. Then "ai, se eu te pego, ai, ai, se eu te pego." - "Ooh, if I catch you." The verse then repeats with "Delícia, delícia" instead of "Nossa, nossa." The third verse of the song is the only verse with a narrative text: describing a Saturday night, a crowd beginning to dance, and summoning courage to speak to the most beautiful girl. Verses 4 and 5 repeat the simple exclamations of verses 1 and 2.

Michel Teló version

Antônio Dyggs, who co-wrote the song, realized it could become a national hit in Brazil and offered it for a release by Brazilian singer Michel Teló. The result was a hit in Brazil, Latin America and Europe.

Teló's version of the song became a hit in Brazil, reaching No. 1. Later, the song also reached No. 1 in 23 countries in Europe and Latin America. In the United States, the single topped both the Billboard Hot Latin Songs and Latin Pop Songs and peaked at No. 81 on the Billboard Hot 100, making Michel Teló the fourth Brazilian solo act to enter the Billboard Hot 100, following Astrud Gilberto, Sérgio Mendes and Morris Albert.

"Ai Se Eu Te Pego" was the sixth best-selling single of 2012 worldwide with over 7.2 million in sales that year, placing it on the list of best-selling singles of all time. The single has become the most downloaded digital track in Germany since 2006. As of July 2014, it is the 90th best-selling single of the 21st century in France, with 308,000 units sold. The official YouTube video has over a billion views as of April 2022.

This version was nominated for Best Brazilian Song at the 2012 Latin Grammy Awards, but lost out to "Querido Diário" by Chico Buarque.

This song also featured as soundtrack in Konami football video game, Pro Evolution Soccer 2013.

Track listing
 Digital download
 "Ai Se Eu Te Pego" – 2:46

 CD single
 "Ai Se Eu Te Pego" – 2:46
 "Ai Se Eu Te Pego" (Music Video) – 2:46

 "If I Catch You" (Remixes) - EP
 "If I Catch You" (Original Mix) – 2:47
 "If I Catch You" (Live Mix) – 2:47
 "If I Catch You" (Chill Version 1) – 2:51
 "If I Catch You" (Chill Version 2) – 2:43

 German Digital EP
 "Ai Se Eu Te Pego" – 2:46
 "Ai Se Eu Te Pego" (A Class Edit) – 3:04
 "Ai Se Eu Te Pego" (A Class Floor Mix) – 3:39
 "Ai Se Eu Te Pego" (Rudeejay Remix) – 5:57
 "Ai Se Eu Te Pego" (Sagi Abitbul Remix) – 3:36

 UK Digital EP
 "Ai Se Eu Te Pego" (feat. Becky G) – 3:18
 "Ai Se Eu Te Pego" (Ao Vivo) – 2:52
 "Ai Se Eu Te Pego" (If I Get Ya) [feat. Pitbull] – 4:07
 "Ai Se Eu Te Pego" (Cahill Remix) – 3:13

 Other versions
 "Ai Se Eu Te Pego" (If I Get Ya) (Worldwide Remix) [feat. Pitbull] – 4:06
 "Ai Se Eu Te Pego" (Spanish Version) – 2:45

Charts

Weekly charts

Year-end charts

Decade-end charts

Certifications

Release history

Other versions
There are many translated versions of "Ai Se Eu Te Pego", such as:
Dutch singer Gerard Joling released "Dan voel je me beter" (English: "You will feel me better that way"). This version reached the 9th position in the Mega Single Top 100. 
Dutch singer Tom Haver also recorded a Dutch version of the song, called "Samen vanavond" ("Together tonight"). This version reached the 66th position in the Mega Single Top 100.
Serbian singer Dragan Kojić released "Kosa" (English: "Hair"). This version was very popular in Serbia, Bosnia & Herzegovina, Montenegro and Croatia, as well in the Republic of Macedonia.

In popular culture

Popularity in sport
The song is especially popular among footballers. It was first danced by Brazilian player Neymar who initially appeared on a video dancing to the song "Ai Se Eu Te Pego". Many other videos of the same player emerged later leading to its huge popularity in Brazil.

The song became extremely popular in Spain and all over Europe after Real Madrid players Marcelo and Cristiano Ronaldo celebrated a goal dancing to the choreography of the song. Playing in a La Liga match, the dance was performed by the two players after Ronaldo scored the first goal against Málaga on 22 October 2011. The popularity was such that on 12 January 2012, Michel Teló was invited to the Real Madrid training ground and posed for pictures with Marcelo and Ronaldo. The goal celebration has been performed by many other footballers across Europe.

Muay Thai kickboxer Sudsakorn Sor Klinmee danced and sang along to "Ai Se Eu Te Pego" in the ring following his win over Marco Piqué at Yokkao Extreme 2012 in Milan on 21 January 2012. The mixed martial artists Fabrício Werdum and Dave Herman have used the song as their entrance music. Werdum walked out to it before facing Mike Russow at UFC 147 in Rio de Janeiro on 23 June 2012, while Herman entered to the song ahead of his match with Antônio Rodrigo Nogueira at UFC 153 on 13 October 2012, also in Rio.

See also

List of number-one hits of 2012 (Austria)
List of Ultratop 40 number-one singles of 2012
List of Ultratop 50 number-one singles of 2012
List of Hot 100 number-one singles of 2012 (Brazil)
List of number-one popular hits of 2012 (Brazil)
List of number-one hits of 2012 (France)
List of number-one hits of 2012 (Germany)
List of Dutch Top 40 number-one singles of 2012
List of number-one singles of 2012 (Poland)
List of number-one singles of 2012 (Spain)
List of number-one hits of 2012 (Switzerland)
List of number-one Billboard Top Latin Songs of 2012
List of number-one Billboard Hot Latin Pop Airplay of 2012
List of Romanian Top 100 number ones of the 2010s

References

External links
Micheltelo.com – Official website
Michel Telo Biography
CangaiaDeJegue.com.br – Official website

2011 singles
Portuguese-language songs
Brasil Hot 100 Airplay number-one singles
Brasil Hot Pop number-one singles
Number-one singles in Austria
Number-one singles in Colombia
SNEP Top Singles number-one singles
Number-one singles in Germany
Number-one singles in Greece
Number-one singles in Honduras
Number-one singles in Israel
Number-one singles in Italy
Number-one singles in Poland
Number-one singles in Romania
Number-one singles in Russia
Number-one singles in Spain
Number-one singles in Sweden
Number-one singles in Switzerland
Record Report Pop Rock General number-one singles
Record Report Top Latino number-one singles
Ultratop 50 Singles (Flanders) number-one singles
Ultratop 50 Singles (Wallonia) number-one singles
2012 singles
Live singles
Michel Teló songs
2008 songs